The 1982 Coupe de France Final was a football match held at Parc des Princes, Paris on May 15, 1982, that saw Paris Saint-Germain FC defeat AS Saint-Étienne in a penalty shoot out. After normal time and extra-time could not separate the two sides, the match was to be decided on penalty kicks. Christian Lopez missed for AS Saint-Étienne.

Match details

See also
Coupe de France 1981-82

External links
Coupe de France results at Rec.Sport.Soccer Statistics Foundation
Report on French federation site

Coupe
1982
Coupe De France Final 1982
Coupe De France Final 1982
Coupe de France Final 1982
Coupe De France Final
Coupe De France Final